Amanda McDougall is a politician in Nova Scotia, Canada. She became the first woman elected mayor of the Cape Breton Regional Municipality on October 17, 2020 and was sworn in on November 5, 2020. Before being elected mayor, she served as a councillor in district 8 in 2016, and was the executive director of the nonprofit environmental organization ACAP Cape Breton.

References 

Living people
Mayors of Cape Breton Regional Municipality
Women mayors of places in Nova Scotia
21st-century Canadian women politicians
Year of birth missing (living people)